Thorpeness Windmill is a Grade II listed post mill at Thorpeness, Suffolk, England which was built in 1803 at Aldringham and moved to Thorpeness in 1923. Originally built as a corn mill, it was converted to a water pumping mill when it was moved to Thorpeness. It pumped water to the House in the Clouds.

History
Thorpeness Mill was built as a corn mill at Aldringham in 1803. In the 1890s the Ogilvy family were the millers.

In the winter of 1922, Aldringham Mill was dismantled by Messrs Whitmore's, millwrights of Wickham Market. Amos Clarke was millwright in charge. It was rebuilt at Thorpeness to supply water to the House in the Clouds, which is really a water tower disguised as a house.

The mill was used to supply the House in the clouds until 1940, when an engine was installed to do the job. During the war, some children blocked the tramway that the winding wheels driven by the fantail run on, with the result that the steps lifted up and the mill tilted forward, leaving the steps in the air. Although a number of men sat on the steps of the mill, it would not return to its natural state. Millwright Ted Friend, of Whitmore's was called in and soon restored the mill to normal with deft use of a sledge hammer. In 1972, the fantail was blown off in a storm and in September 1973 the mill was damaged by a fire on the heath where it stands. One sail and stock were destroyed. In 1975, Suffolk Coastal District Council, Thorpeness Estate and the Countryside Commission granted money to enable the mill to be restored. The mill was restored in 1977 and subsequently purchased from the Thorpeness Estate by Suffolk County Council.

In 2010 the Council put the Windmill on the market for sale at an estimated price £150,000.

The Council accepted an offer of £72,100 in November 2010 (figures from Land Registry)

Description

Thorpeness Mill is a post mill on a single-storey roundhouse. It is winded by a fantail arranged in the Suffolk style. The four Patent sails are carried on a cast-iron windshaft. The mill is winded by a six-bladed fantail mounted on the ladder.

Millers
Ogilvy 1890s–1922

Public access
Thorpeness Windmill is now in private hands and as such there is no public access. The windmill will be open on an ad hoc basis by the owner. For more information, look for "Friends of Thorpeness Windmill" on Facebook.

References

External links
Friends Of Thorpness Windmill Facebook Page
Windmill World webpage on Thorpeness Mill.
Video of Thorpeness Mill in 2009.

Windmills in Suffolk
Post mills in the United Kingdom
Grade II listed buildings in Suffolk
Windmills completed in 1923
Windpumps in the United Kingdom
Buildings and structures in Suffolk